The arrondissement of Thann-Guebwiller is an arrondissement of France in the Haut-Rhin department in the Grand Est region. It has 81 communes.

Composition

The communes of the arrondissement of Thann-Guebwiller are:

Aspach-le-Bas
Aspach-Michelbach
Bergholtz
Bergholtzzell
Biltzheim
Bitschwiller-lès-Thann
Bourbach-le-Bas
Bourbach-le-Haut
Buhl
Burnhaupt-le-Bas
Burnhaupt-le-Haut
Cernay
Dolleren
Ensisheim
Fellering
Geishouse
Goldbach-Altenbach
Gueberschwihr
Guebwiller
Guewenheim
Gundolsheim
Hartmannswiller
Hattstatt
Le Haut-Soultzbach
Husseren-Wesserling
Issenheim
Jungholtz
Kirchberg
Kruth
Lautenbach
Lautenbachzell
Lauw
Leimbach
Linthal
Malmerspach
Masevaux-Niederbruck
Merxheim
Meyenheim
Mitzach
Mollau
Moosch
Munwiller
Murbach
Niederentzen
Niederhergheim
Oberbruck
Oberentzen
Oberhergheim
Oderen
Orschwihr
Osenbach
Pfaffenheim
Raedersheim
Rammersmatt
Ranspach
Réguisheim
Rimbach-près-Guebwiller
Rimbach-près-Masevaux
Rimbachzell
Roderen
Rouffach
Saint-Amarin
Schweighouse-Thann
Sentheim
Sewen
Sickert
Soppe-le-Bas
Soultz-Haut-Rhin
Soultzmatt
Steinbach
Storckensohn
Thann
Uffholtz
Urbès
Vieux-Thann
Wattwiller
Wegscheid
Westhalten
Wildenstein
Willer-sur-Thur
Wuenheim

History

The arrondissement of Thann-Guebwiller was created in January 2015 from 42 communes of the former arrondissement of Guebwiller and 49 communes of the former arrondissement of Thann. In January 2017 seven communes from the arrondissement of Thann-Guebwiller joined the arrondissement of Colmar-Ribeauvillé.

References

Thann-Guebwiller